Andreas Raido Karuks Vaikla (born 19 February 1997) is a professional footballer who plays as a goalkeeper. Born in Canada, he represented Estonia at international level.

Club career

Early career
Vaikla began playing football in Canada. In 2013, he received a call-up to the Estonia under-16 team, being eligible due to his Estonian parents. He was scouted by West Bromwich Albion in a match against the Republic of Ireland, which led to him later joining the English club's academy the same year.

IFK Norrköping
On 24 July 2015, Vaikla signed a year-and-a-half contract with Swedish club IFK Norrköping. He was a part of the IFK Norrköping squad that won both the 2015 Allsvenskan and the 2015 Svenska Supercupen, however only appearing as an unused substitute. Vaikla made his debut for the club on 20 February 2016, a day after his 19th birthday, keeping a clean sheet in a 4–0 victory over Östersunds FK in the 2015–16 Svenska Cupen. On April 22, Vaikla made his debut in the Allsvenskan, replacing the injured David Mitov Nilsson in the 19th minute of a 1–2 loss to Falkenbergs FF. He made 13 league appearances in the 2016 season.

IFK Mariehamn
On 1 February 2017, Vaikla signed a three-year contract with Finnish champions IFK Mariehamn. He made his debut in the Veikkausliiga on 8 April 2017, in a 5–2 home victory over JJK.

Kristiansund
On 28 December 2017, Vaikla signed a two-year contract with Norwegian club Kristiansund.

Return to Norrköping
In August 2019, he returned to Swedish club IFK Norrköping.

Narva Trans
In February 2020, he joined Estonian club JK Narva Trans of the top division Meistriliiga, after declining some offers from teams in Scandiavian countries who were only offering backup roles. He dealt with various injuries over the course of the season, eventually having his contract terminated in October, due to continuing injuries.

Toronto FC II
On May 18, 2021, he signed with Toronto FC II of USL League One. He made his debut on May 29 against North Texas SC in a 1–1 draw. In July, he earned USL League One Save of the Week honours for Week 15 for a save against North Carolina FC. He was named to the USL League One Team of the Week for Weeks 20 and 21.

On 24 March 2022, Vaikla went on loan with Canadian Premier League side FC Edmonton. He made his debut for Edmonton on April 10, in the season-opener against Valour FC.

International career
Born in Canada to Estonian parents, Vaikla has represented Estonia at under-16, under-17, under-19, and under-21 levels.

On 14 March 2016, Vaikla was called up by manager Magnus Pehrsson to the Estonia squad to face Norway and Serbia in friendly matches, but remained an unused substitute. He made his debut for the senior national team on 1 June 2016, keeping a clean sheet in a 2–0 friendly home win over Andorra.

Career statistics

Club

International

References

External links

1997 births
Living people
Soccer players from Toronto
Estonian footballers
Canadian soccer players
Canadian people of Estonian descent
Association football goalkeepers
Allsvenskan players
Veikkausliiga players
Eliteserien players
Meistriliiga players
USL League One players
Canadian Premier League players
West Bromwich Albion F.C. players
IFK Norrköping players
IFK Mariehamn players
Kristiansund BK players
JK Narva Trans players
Toronto FC II players
FC Edmonton players
Estonia youth international footballers
Estonia under-21 international footballers
Estonia international footballers
Estonian expatriate footballers
Canadian expatriate soccer players
Canadian expatriate sportspeople in England
Estonian expatriate sportspeople in England
Expatriate footballers in England
Estonian expatriate sportspeople in Sweden
Canadian expatriate sportspeople in Sweden
Expatriate footballers in Sweden
Estonian expatriate sportspeople in Finland
Canadian expatriate sportspeople in Finland
Expatriate footballers in Finland
Estonian expatriate sportspeople in Norway
Canadian expatriate sportspeople in Norway
Expatriate footballers in Norway